was a small minelayer of the Imperial Japanese Navy, which was in service during the final stages of World War II. She was named after Kamishima Island, a small island in Mie Prefecture, offshore Toba, Mie. She was the lead ship of the two-vessel .

Building
During the very final stages of World War II, in preparation for the anticipated Allied  invasion of the Japanese home islands, the Imperial Japanese Navy saw the need to block the entrances to the Sea of Japan to protect Japan’s relatively lightly defended western coast. However, as almost all minelayers had been sunk by that time, an emergency program was begun to construct several small vessels for this task. Kamishima was launched by the Sasebo Naval Arsenal on June 12, 1945, and was commissioned into service on July 30, 1945.

Operational history
On completion, Kamishima was assigned to the Sasebo Naval District, but the surrender of Japan occurred only 15 days after her commissioning. She was removed from the navy list on September 15, 1945.
From September 1945 through June 1947, Kamishima was used as a repatriation vessel, shuttling between ports in Korea and Shanghai, and Kyushu, returning demobilized Japanese troops and civilians. On October 3, 1947, the American occupation forces turned  Kamishima over to the Soviet Union as war reparations at the port of Nakhodka, where she was subsequently commissioned into the Soviet Navy's Pacific Fleet and transferred to Vladivostok in October.

She was converted at Nikolayevsk-on-Amur port into a hydrography vessel Katun (Катунь). 74.5x7.8x2.6meters. 2x950h.p. 16.5knots. Range - 5000 miles. From year 1954 - boilership. Deleted from TO&E in 1956.

In 1955, when the Soviet Navy ended its lease of Port Arthur, the Soviet gifted Kamishima and two other former IJN escort ships to China. Kamishima served under Chinese flag using the name 'Minelayer No. 50'. It was eventually sold for scrap in the early 1980s.

References

Bibliography

External links

Minelayers of the Imperial Japanese Navy
World War II mine warfare vessels of Japan
Ships built by Sasebo Naval Arsenal
1945 ships